Matt Healy may refer to:

Matt Healy (born 1970), Scottish actor appearing in Emmerdale
Matt Healy (rugby union) (born 1989), Irish rugby player
Matty Healy (born 1989), lead singer of The 1975